Michele Drolet was the first American woman to win a medal in cross country skiing; she won the bronze medal at the 1994 Paralympic games in Lillehammer, Norway.  She graduated from Mount Holyoke College in 1976.

References 

American female cross-country skiers
Paralympic cross-country skiers of the United States
Cross-country skiers at the 1994 Winter Paralympics
Mount Holyoke College alumni
Living people
Year of birth missing (living people)
Place of birth missing (living people)
Paralympic bronze medalists for the United States
Medalists at the 1994 Winter Paralympics
Paralympic medalists in cross-country skiing
21st-century American women